The zebra finches are two species of estrildid finch in the genus Taeniopygia found in Australia and Indonesia. They are seed-eaters that travel in large flocks.

The species are:

Previously, both species were classified as a single species, the zebra finch (T. guttata). However, they were split by the IUCN Red List and BirdLife International in 2016. The International Ornithological Congress followed suit in 2022 based on studies noting differences in plumage, mtDNA divergence, and assortative mating between both species in captivity.

The zebra finch was first captured in 1801 during Nicolas Baudin's expedition to Australia. The Indonesian species was described in 1817 by Louis Jean Pierre Vieillot in his Nouveau Dictionnaire d'Histoire Naturelle, where he gave it the scientific name Fringilla guttata. The Australian species was then described in 1837 by John Gould as Amadina castanotis. Its current genus, Taeniopygia, was described in 1862 by Ludwig Reichenbach. It is placed in the tribe Poephilini, along with the genus Poephila, which it was previously included in; the split between Taeniopygia and Poephila is justified by a 1987 study using protein electrophoresis and chromosomal banding.

The zebra finches likely evolved in Australia, with either northern or southeastern Australia postulated as two places where the genus arose. This allowed T. castanotis swept out to sea by cyclones to see mountains near the west coast of Timor, which prompted them to make landfall on the island.

The morphological differences between the species include differences in size. T. guttata is smaller than T. castanotis. In addition, the T. guttata males do not have the fine barring found on the throat and upper breast and have smaller breast bands.

Although the Sunda zebra finch was described first, the Australian zebra finch is the far more famous member of the genus, due to its status as a popular pet as well as a model organism for the wider study of birds.

Zebra finches are more social than many migratory birds, generally traveling in small bands and sometimes gathering in larger groups. They are one of the bird species that is able to learn new vocalizations and have become a dominant model species in the study of vocal learning.
There is evidence that some aspects of this are culturally transmitted and that the songs of geographically distant populations can change over time, resulting in new dialects. Research also shows that zebra finches hear and respond to variations in bird song that are not apparent to human listeners. Female zebra finches show a preference for mates with a dialect similar to the one of their adolescent peers. Researchers are exploring analogies between human language and birdsong.

Citations

Sources 

Bird genera
Estrildidae
Taeniopygia
Taxa named by Ludwig Reichenbach